The 2014 Fujieda MYFC season sees Fujieda MYFC compete in J. League Division 3 for the first team.

Players

First team squad
As of 13 February 2014

J3 League

League table

Results

Squad statistics

Appearances and goals

|}

Top scorers

Disciplinary record

References

Fujieda MYFC
Fujieda MYFC seasons